The Whitby Town Council is the governing body of the town of Whitby, Ontario, Canada, a lower-tier municipality within the Regional Municipality of Durham. It consists of a Mayor; four local Ward Councillors, each of whom represents a particular ward; and four Regional Councillors who, like the Mayor, are elected at-large in a double direct election to also represent the Town on Durham Regional Council.

Under provincial legislation, municipal elections are held every four years, with the most recent one having occurred on October 24, 2022.

Responsibilities of Council 
As set out in the Ontario Municipal Act, the Town Council is responsible for 
 Representing the public and considering the well-being and interests of the municipality;
 Developing and evaluating the policies and programs of the municipality;
 Determining which services the town provides;
 Ensuring that administrative practices and procedures are in place to implement the decisions of Council;
 Ensuring the accountability and transparency of the operations of the municipality, including the activities of senior management;
 Maintaining the financial integrity of the municipality;
 Carrying out the duties of Council under provincial law.

Generally speaking, the Members of Council are responsible for setting the policy direction for the town; authorizing revenues (taxes and fees) and expenditures by the Town to provide residents with services that meet their needs and expectations; and reviewing and approving land use and development issues.

Members of Council

Town Council 2022-2026
The 2022 municipal election was held on October 24, 2022.

Town Council 2018-2022
The 2018 municipal election was held on October 22, 2018.

Town Council 2014-2018
The 2014 municipal election was held on October 27, 2014.

Town Council 2010-2014
The 2010 municipal election was held on October 25, 2010.

References

External links 
 Whitby Town Council
 2018 Municipal Election Results

Municipal councils in Ontario
Whitby, Ontario
Municipal government of the Regional Municipality of Durham